North Bloomfield School is a historic school located at North Bloomfield in Livingston County, New York. It is a two-story, painted common brick structure set on a coursed-rubble foundation and stone watertable. It was originally planned and constructed by the First Universalist Society of Lima between 1827 and 1829.  The building was to be a "meeting house" for services held by the newly formed church. From 1842 the building was rented for elementary-grade classes while continuing to be used for services at other times. In the mid-19th century, the second-floor stage and Italianate cupola were added. Joint use of the building continued until 1872, when the church built a separate building.  The school closed in 1951, and the building has since been remodeled into two apartments.

It was listed on the National Register of Historic Places in 1981.

References

School buildings on the National Register of Historic Places in New York (state)
Italianate architecture in New York (state)
School buildings completed in 1829
Buildings and structures in Livingston County, New York
National Register of Historic Places in Livingston County, New York